Moht Moht Myint Aung (also Moh Moh Myint Aung) is a five-time Myanmar Academy Award winning Burmese film actress, best known for her leading lady roles in several Burmese films from the 1980s to the 2000s.

Early life
Moht Moht Myint Aung was born in Yangon, the fifth child and youngest daughter of Myint Aung, a successful Burmese actor and director. She grew up in the Kyaukmyaung section of Tamwe Township. She wanted to be an actress like the leading ladies of the day like Wah Wah Win Shwe and Khin Than Nu. She attended high school at BEHS 1 Tamwe but failed the university matriculation exam several times. With most of her friends attending college, she gave up attending college and decided to focus on a film career.

Career
Moht Moht Myint Aung was virtually unknown until Kyaw Hein, one of the top leading men of his era, chose her to star in one of his films, Mun-Tet-Chein-Mha Nay-Win-Thi (The Sun Sets at Noon), in 1979. She was still in 8th Standard at the time. After winning her first Academy Award for 1984, Mo Mo Myint Aung established herself as one of the leading actresses of Burmese cinema.

She is one of very few actresses in the Burmese film history able to lead a successful multi-decade career in a leading lady role. Mo Mo Myint Aung is still popular, seen by many as having aged gracefully, and continues to appear in several films in age appropriate roles. In a testament to her enduring popularity, she won her latest Academy Award for Best Actress for 2008.

Television
Moht Moht Myint Aung is on the judges panel in the show Myanmar's Got Talent,  the Burmese franchise of the Got Talent series.

Filmography
Moht Moht Myint Aung has made several movies over her over-three-decade-long career. She has won five Myanmar Academy Awards for both Best Actress and Best Supporting Actress categories.

Film (Cinema)
Moon Tae Chain Twin Nay Win The (1982)
Myo Pya Hna Lone Thar (1984)
Kyee Yaung Saung Thaw Daung (1985)
Khat Sein Sein Nay Pa Mal (1989)
Thamee Nae A May Myar (1991)
Ma Thudamasari (1994)
Eain Met Yar Thi (2001)
Ma Nyein Thaw Mee (2002)
Myint Mo Htet Ka Tharaphu (2008)

TV series
Forever Mandalay (2014)
Kyee Myat Thaw Martar (2018)

TV show
Myanmar's Got Talent

Awards and nominations

References

Burmese film actresses
Living people
1960 births
People from Yangon
20th-century Burmese actresses